Sven Otto Birkeland (born 10 February 1948) is a Norwegian former professional footballer who played as a midfielder.

Birkeland was born in Kristiansand. He played as a midfielder for Start from 1973–78, and won the league in 1978. He began his career at Vigør and played for Lyn from 1969 to 1973. He also played for Jerv and was the coach of Donn. Birkeland was the match winner against Bodø/Glimt when Start's first league title was secured on 15 October 1978.

He has five caps and one goal for the Norway national team, and made his debut against Sweden in 1967, becoming the first sørlending to play for Norway. 

Birkeland is the father of the former Start player Bernt Christian Birkeland.

Career statistics 
Score and result list Norway's goal tally first, score column indicates score after Birkeland goal.

References

External links 
 
 fotball.no
 Aftenposten arkiv
 Fædrelandsvennen – Fra Starts gullhelt til sauebonde
Start i hundre – 

1948 births
Living people
Sportspeople from Kristiansand
Norwegian footballers
Association football midfielders
Norway international footballers
Eliteserien players
Lyn Fotball players
IK Start players
FK Jerv players